Gerry Fisher, B.S.C. (23 June 1926 – 2 December 2014) was an English cinematographer.

Biography

He was born in London in 1926. Early employment by Kodak and De Havilland Aircraft was followed by service in the Royal Navy during WW II. Fisher then worked as a clapper boy at Alliance Riverside Studios, Twickenham, and as assistant cameraman on documentaries for Wessex Films, before becoming a Focus puller at Shepperton Studios. After years in this capacity on films such as An Inspector Calls (1954), he was promoted to camera operator on Bridge on the River Kwai (1957), before finally becoming director of photography on Joseph Losey's Accident (1967). He collaborated with Losey on a further seven films, including The Go-Between in 1971. In 1976 Fisher was nominated for the Best Cinematography Award by the British Society of Cinematographers, for Aces High, and in 1977 was nominated for a BAFTA Award for the same film. In 1977 he was nominated in the César Awards for Best Cinematography for Monsieur Klein.

The film directors Fisher frequently collaborated with included Losey, Tony Richardson, Sidney Lumet, John Huston, William Peter Blatty, John Frankenheimer and, latterly, Michael Ritchie.

Fisher and his wife retired to The Film and Television Charity's Glebelands Care Home at Wokingham in Berkshire. He died on 2 December 2014, at the Royal Berkshire Hospital in nearby Reading, at the age of 88.

Selected filmography

As cinematographer 

Accident (1967)
Sebastian (1968)
Interlude (1968)
The Sea Gull (1968)
Secret Ceremony (1968)
Hamlet (1969)
Ned Kelly (1970)
Man in the Wilderness (1971)
The Go-Between (1971)
A Doll's House (1973)
The Offence (1973)
Butley (1974)
S*P*Y*S (1974)
Juggernaut (1974)
The Adventure of Sherlock Holmes' Smarter Brother (1975)
The Romantic Englishwoman (1975)
Dogpound Shuffle (1975)
Brannigan (1975)
Aces High (1976)
Monsieur Klein (1976)
The Last Remake of Beau Geste (1977)
The Island of Dr. Moreau (1977)
Fedora (1978)
Roads to the South (1978)
Wise Blood (1979)
Don Giovanni (1979)
The Ninth Configuration (1980)
Wolfen (1981)
Escape to Victory (1981)
Lovesick (1983)
Yellowbeard (1983)
The Holcroft Covenant (1985)
Highlander (1986)
Running on Empty (1988)
Dead Bang (1989)
Black Rainbow (1989)
The Exorcist III (1990)
Company Business (1991)
Diggstown (1992)
Cops and Robbersons (1994)
When Saturday Comes (1996)

References

External links
 
 interview British Entertainment History Project

1926 births
2014 deaths
English cinematographers
Film people from London
People from Wokingham